Abraham Lempel (10 February 1936 – 4 February 2023) was an Israeli computer scientist and one of the fathers of the LZ family of lossless data compression algorithms.

Biography
Lempel was born on 10 February 1936 in Lwów, Poland (now Lviv, Ukraine). He studied at Technion - Israel Institute of Technology, and received a B.Sc. in 1963, an M.Sc. in 1965, and a D.Sc. in 1967. Since 1977 he held the title of full professor, and was a professor emeritus at Technion.

His historically-important works start with the presentation of the LZ77 algorithm in a paper entitled "A Universal Algorithm for Sequential Data Compression" in the IEEE Transactions on Information Theory (May 1977), co-authored by Jacob Ziv.

Lempel was the recipient of the 1998 Golden Jubilee Award for Technological Innovation from the IEEE Information Theory Society; and the 2007 IEEE Richard W. Hamming Medal for "pioneering work in data compression, especially the Lempel-Ziv algorithm".

Lempel founded HP Labs—Israel in 1994, and served as its director until October 2007.

Lempel died on 4 February 2023, one week before his 87th birthday.

Works 
The LZ77 and LZ78 algorithms authored by Lempel and Jacob Ziv have led to a number of derivative works, including the Lempel–Ziv–Welch algorithm, used in the GIF image format, and the Lempel-Ziv-Markov chain algorithm, used in the 7-Zip and xz compressors. The algorithms have also been used as originally published in formats such as DEFLATE, used in the PNG image format.

Bibliography

See also
 Timeline of algorithms
 Data compression
 Oblivious transfer

References

External links
 Abraham Lempel – GHN: IEEE Global History Network
 
 Technion: Computer Science Department: Prof. Abraham Lempel
 
 

1936 births
2023 deaths
Israeli computer scientists
Modern cryptographers
Israeli information theorists
Academic staff of Technion – Israel Institute of Technology
Members of the United States National Academy of Sciences
Members of the European Academy of Sciences and Arts
Jewish scientists
Scientists from Lviv
Israeli Jews
Israeli people of Polish-Jewish descent
Polish emigrants to Israel